Al-Masmiyya al-Kabira was a Palestinian village in the Gaza Subdistrict, located  northeast of Gaza. With a land area of 20,687 dunams, the village site (135 dunams) was situated on an elevation of  along the coastal plain. It was depopulated during the 1948 Arab–Israeli War. Before the war, it had a population of 2,520 in 1945.

History
Remains from the Roman and  Byzantine eras have been found here, including a coin  made under Emperor Mauritius Tiberius (596–597 CE).  Remains, including pottery and glass were  found  from the Umayyad and Abbasid periods, with local glass-industry operation here in the  Abbasid era. The settlement continued during Ayyubid  and Mamluk times, with the wealth of pottery and glass found here indicating a strong economy.  
An undated column-base, with a Nine men's morris pattern incised  has also been found here.

Ottoman era
Al-Masmiyya was mentioned by the Syrian Sufi teacher and traveller Mustafa al-Bakri al-Siddiqi (1688-1748/9) in the first half of the eighteenth century, and in the 1780s, the French traveller Volney noted that the village produced a great deal of spun-cotton.

In 1838, el-Mesmiyeh was noted as a Muslim village in the Gaza district.

In 1863, the French explorer Victor Guérin visited the village, which he found to have seven hundred inhabitants. Around the well were stones, some large, and apparently  ancient.  The village was surrounded by  plantations of  tobacco,  watermelons and cucumbers.  An Ottoman village list of about 1870 showed that “El-Mesmije”  had 243 houses and a population of 656, though the population count included only men.

The adjectival al-Kabira ("major") was later added to Masmiyya's name to distinguish it from the nearby al-Masmiyya al-Saghira, established in the mid-19th century. In the late 19th century, al-Masmiyya al-Kabira was laid out in a trapezoid-like pattern, with the long base of the trapezoid facing west. The village was surrounded by gardens and its houses were constructed of adobe bricks or concrete. The most recent expansion of it was westward and southwestward.

British Mandate era
In the 1922 census of Palestine conducted by the British Mandate authorities, Mesmiyet Kabira had a population of 1390 Muslims, increasing in the  1931 census when Masmiya al Kabira had a population of 1756 Muslims and 4 Christians, in a total of 354 houses.

The village contained two mosques and  two schools. The boys' school was built in 1922 and had an enrollment of 307 students in 1947, while the girls' school was built in 1944 and had 39 students 1947. Al-Masmiyya al-Kabira was one of the few localities in the district to be governed by a village council. The town had a gas station and a clinic.

In the 1945 statistics, Al-Masmiyya al-Kabira had 2,520 inhabitants; 2,510 Muslims and 10 Christians,  with a total of  20,687  dunams of land, according to an official land and population survey. Agriculture was the main economic activity of the village and the dominant crops were citrus and grains; in 1945, a total of 1,005 dunams were devoted to citrus, while 18,092 were allotted to grains, while 135 dunams were built-up land. Beside crop cultivation, residents raised livestock and poultry. Some also worked in the nearby British Army camp. Al-Masmiyya al-Kabira had a weekly market on Thursdays that attracted residents from neighboring communities.

1948 War and aftermath

The village was fenced in by Hagana forces purportedly to protect the village against Deir Yassin like incidents. Al-Masmiyya al-Kabira was captured by the Israeli forces of the Givati Brigade during Operation An-Far. The New York Times reported that it had been occupied on 11 July, blocking an Egyptian attempt to break through to Latrun from the direction of al-Majdal. However, the Haganah claim it was captured during "several clearing operations in the brigade's rear guard, to eliminate the threat and danger posed by the presence of Arab civilian concentrations to the rear of the front."

Following the war the area was incorporated into the State of Israel and Morris reports that by 27 May 1949, 21 of the approx 400 former Palestinian Arab villages had been repopulated by newly arrived ‘olim, Al-Masmiyya al-Kabira along with Aqir, Zarnuqa, Yibna, Ijzim, Ein Hawd, Tarshiha, Safsaf, Tarbikha, Dayr Tarif and that six more including Deir Yassin were slated for colonization. Two moshavim, Bnei Re'em and Hatzav, were established on al-Masmiyya al-Kabira's land in 1949, with Yinon also founded on the village's former land in 1952. In 1976, another new village, Ahva was established on the land. A Palestinian Arab family was able to remain in the area and was used as Shabbat goy by the community of Bnei Re'em.

According to Palestinian historian Walid Khalidi, in reference to the remains of al-Masmiyya al-Kabira in 1992:

The two schools and several village houses are extant. The girls' school is deserted, while the boys' school has been converted into an Israeli army installation. Some of the houses are inhabited, but others have been turned into warehouses. One house serves as a shop where juice is sold. All are made of concrete with simple architectural features—flat roofs and rectangular doors and windows. A date palm tree grows in the yard of a house that belonged to a Palestinian named Tawfiq al-Rabi. An Israeli gas station is located on the same spot where the village's gas station (once the property of Hasan Abd al-Aziz and Nimr Muhanna) once stood. The lands in the vicinity are cultivated by Israeli farmers.

References

Bibliography

External links
Welcome To al-Masmiyya al-Kabira
al-Masmiyya al-Kabira,  Zochrot
Al-Masmiyya Al-Kabira, palestine-family.net
Survey of Western Palestine, Map 16:   IAA, Wikimedia commons
al-Masmiyya al-Kabira from the Khalil Sakakini Cultural Center

District of Gaza
Arab villages depopulated during the 1948 Arab–Israeli War